Caffeine & Big Dreams is the second studio album by Canadian country music artist Kira Isabella. It was released on October 14, 2014 via Sony Music Canada. The album includes the singles "Quarterback", "Gone Enough" and "Shake It If Ya Got It".

Critical reception
Shenieka Russell-Metcalf of Top Country called the album "amazing," writing that it "shows off Kira's matured voice, growth as an artist and proves yet again that she is full of so much talent."

Track listing

References

2014 albums
Kira Isabella albums
Sony Music Canada albums